Anian Sossau (born 14 January 2000) is a German cross-country skier.

He participated in the sprint event at the FIS Nordic World Ski Championships 2021.

Cross-country skiing results
All results are sourced from the International Ski Federation (FIS).

World Championships

World Cup

Season standings

Team podiums
 1 podium – (1 )

References

External links

2000 births
Living people
German male cross-country skiers
21st-century German people